State Route 66 (SR 66) is a  state highway in the west-central part of the U.S. state of Alabama. The western terminus of the highway is at an intersection with SR 28 at Consul, an unincorporated community in eastern Marengo County. The eastern terminus of the highway is at an intersection with SR 5 near the unincorporated community of Safford, in western Dallas County.

Route description

SR 66 is the second of four state highways that connect Linden with Selma. It assumes an eastward trajectory as it connects SR 28 and SR 5, traveling through rural areas in Alabama’s Black Belt. The highway is aligned along a two-lane road and does not travel through any incorporated communities.

History

SR 66 was established in 1957. It replaced Marengo County Road 38. A previous segment of SR 66 existed from 1940 until 1957 in southeastern Alabama.

Major intersections

See also

References

066
Transportation in Marengo County, Alabama
Transportation in Dallas County, Alabama